A dial peer, also termed addressable call endpoint, initiates or obtains calls within a telephone network.

See also
VoIP
Session Initiation Protocol
Foreign exchange station
Foreign exchange office
Off-premises extension
Private line automatic ringdown

External links
 http://www.vonage-forum.com/ftopic468.html
 http://www.packetizer.com/voip/h323_vs_sip/
 http://www.w3.org/TR/ws-gloss/

Telephony